The 2002–03 Slovenian Second League season started on 11 August 2002 and ended on 15 June 2003. Each team played a total of 30 matches.

League standing

See also
2002–03 Slovenian PrvaLiga
2002–03 Slovenian Third League

References
NZS archive

External links
Football Association of Slovenia 

Slovenian Second League seasons
2002–03 in Slovenian football
Slovenia